George Bookasta (July 14, 1917 – March 26, 2014) was an American child actor and director who was discovered by Charlie Chaplin. He signed a contract with the film studio United Artists and debuted in the silent film Rosita in 1923. Some of his other films included The Night Bird, Hell Harbor and It Had to Happen. Bookasta was a stand-in in Sergeant York in 1941.

As an adult, he created the magazine TV Times, directed episodes for television shows such as The Colgate Comedy Hour and Bachelor Father, and led a big band orchestra in New York.

Bookasta died March 26, 2014, at the age of 96.

References

External links
 
 George Bookasta at the American Film Institute
 

1917 births
2014 deaths
American male film actors
American male child actors
Male actors from Kansas City, Missouri
American male silent film actors
20th-century American male actors